Kvutzat Yavne is a religious kibbutz in the Central District of Israel. Located in the coastal plain just east of Ashdod, it falls under the jurisdiction of Hevel Yavne Regional Council.
The Kibbutz, is the location of Yeshivat Kerem B'Yavneh.

History

The idea of Kvutzat Yavne was conceived in Germany; 
and then originally called "Kvutzat Rodges".
The intention of the founders was to make the area near ancient Yavne (from which it takes its name) the site of a religious kibbutz and a yeshiva. 

These founders, members of the Religious Zionist movement—specifically, the Association of Religious Pioneers (בח"ד ברית חלוצים דתיים) — began to prepare themselves for agricultural work on German farms in 1929.

Shortly thereafter, they immigrated to Mandate Palestine. They initially settled near Petah Tikva on land purchased by a Jewish-owned German company. Finally, in 1941, the 180-person group of German Zionists, began to build Kvutzat Yavne at its intended location. The kibbutz continued to grow, joined by German, American, and Sabras. It came to be known as the cradle of the Religious Kibbutz Movement, with which the kibbutz is associated.

Economy
Major industry located on the kibbutz includes olive and cucumber processing plants, the Adi watch factory, and the largest chicken hatchery in the country (dispatching 600,000 chicks per day). As above, it is also the location of Yeshivat Kerem B'Yavneh, the first Hesder Yeshiva. The kibbutz used to run a Jewish studies program preparing candidates for conversion to Judaism, but this is no longer available. There was also an Hebrew ulpan for both Jewish students and Gerim.

References

External links

Official website 

German-Jewish culture in Israel
Kibbutzim
Religious Kibbutz Movement
Populated places established in 1941
Populated places in Central District (Israel)
1941 establishments in Mandatory Palestine